Gyraulus is a genus of small, mostly air-breathing, freshwater snails, aquatic pulmonate gastropod mollusks in the family Planorbidae, the ram's horn snails.

The genus Gyraulus is known from the Early Cretaceous to the present. Fossils attributed to Gyraulus sp. have been found in the lakebottom sediments of the Yixian Formation in China, dating to 125 million years ago.

The minute species Gyraulus crista, although technically a pulmonate gastropod, does not use air for respiration, but instead has a mantle cavity which has much water.

Distribution
The distribution of this genus is Holarctic.

Habitat
These snail snails live on water plants in freshwater.

Shell description
Shell of the species within this genus are small, and are mostly almost planispiral in their coiling.

Species
Species within the genus Gyraulus include:

subgenus Armiger W. Hartmann, 1843
 Gyraulus crista (Linnaeus, 1758) - Nautilus ramshorn
 † Gyraulus cristaeformis (Gozhik & Prysjazhnjuk, 1978)
 † Gyraulus decorus (Roshka, 1973) 
 † Gyraulus geniculatus (Sandberger, 1875) 
 † Gyraulus gracilis (Gozhik & Prysjazhnjuk, 1978) 
 † Gyraulus lenapalus (Bourguignat, 1881) 
 † Gyraulus lluecai (Royo Gómez, 1922) 
 † Gyraulus nautiliformis (Gozhik & Prysjazhnjuk, 1978) 
 † Gyraulus subptychophorus (Halaváts, 1903)

subgenus Carinogyraulus Polinski, 1929: represented as Gyraulus

subgenus Gyraulus Charpentier, 1837

 † Gyraulus aegaeus Willmann, 1981 
 † Gyraulus bachmayeri Schlickum & Strauch, 1979
 † Gyraulus bigueti (Fontannes, 1881) 
 † Gyraulus brlici Brusina, 1897 
 † Gyraulus brusinai (Lörenthey, 1894) 
 Gyraulus chinensis (Dunker, 1848)
 † Gyraulus connivens (Eichwald, 1830) 
 † Gyraulus constans (Brusina, 1884) 
 † Gyraulus dalmaticus (Brusina, 1884) 
 † Gyraulus deflexus (Sandberger, 1859) 
 † Gyraulus dimitrovici (Brusina, 1902) 
 † Gyraulus doseni (Brusina, 1902) 
 † Gyraulus formosus (Brusina, 1902) 
 † Gyraulus fragilis (Pavlović, 1903) 
 † Gyraulus goussardianus (Noulet, 1854) 
 † Gyraulus hians (Rolle, 1860) 
 † Gyraulus hoernesi (Rolle, 1860) 
 † Gyraulus inornatus (Brusina, 1902) 
 Gyraulus ioanis Gloer & Pesic, 2007
 Gyraulus janinensis (Mousson, 1859)
 † Gyraulus jukici (Brusina, 1902) 
 † Gyraulus jurkovici (Brusina, 1902) 
 † Gyraulus katurici (Brusina, 1897)
 † Gyraulus kosovensis (Pavlović, 1903) 
 † Gyraulus lazici (Brusina, 1892) 
 † Gyraulus lendli (Brusina, 1902) 
 † Gyraulus lineolatus (Brusina, 1878) 
 † Gyraulus lorentheyi (Brusina, 1902) 
 Gyraulus meierbrooki Gloer & Pesic, 2007
 † Gyraulus multicingulatus (Wenz, 1919)
 † Gyraulus nematophorus (Brusina, 1902) 
 † Gyraulus novaki (Brusina, 1897) 
 † Gyraulus nusici (Pavlović, 1903) 
 † Gyraulus oncostomus (Brusina, 1902) 
 † Gyraulus orahovacensis (Pavlović, 1903) 
 † Gyraulus pachychilus (Brusina, 1902)
 † Gyraulus parvulus (Lörenthey, 1906) 
 † Gyraulus pavlovici (Brusina, 1893) 
 † Gyraulus phacecercus (Brusina, 1902) 
 Gyraulus piscinarum (Bourguignat, 1852)
 † Gyraulus ponticus (Lörenthey, 1893) 
 † Gyraulus porcellaneus (Lörenthey, 1902) 
 † Gyraulus praeponticus (Gorjanović-Kramberger, 1890) 
 † Gyraulus ptychostomus (Brusina, 1902)
 † Gyraulus rotella (Rousseau, 1842) 
 Gyraulus shasi Gloer & Pesic, 2007
 † Gyraulus sibinjensis (Brusina, 1897) 
 † Gyraulus slavonicus (Brusina, 1897) 
 † Gyraulus spratti (Forbes, 1845) 
 † Gyraulus stoppanii (Sacco, 1886) 
 Gyraulus stroemi (Westerlund, 1881)
 † Gyraulus subverticillus (Oppenheim, 1919) 
 † Gyraulus sulfureus (Royo Gómez, 1922)
 † Gyraulus tenuistriatus (Gorjanović-Kramberger, 1899)
 † Gyraulus tetracarinatus (Pavlović, 1903) 
 † Gyraulus virgatus (Ludwig, 1865) 
 † Gyraulus zoebeleini Schlickum & Strauch, 1974 

subgenus Lamorbis Starobogatov, 1967: represented as Gyraulis

subgenus Nautilinus Mousson, 1872
 Gyraulus clymene (Shuttleworth, 1852)

subgenus Torquis Dall, 1905
 Gyraulus laevis (Alder, 1838)

subgenus ?

 Gyraulus acronicus (Férussac, 1807)
 † Gyraulus albertanus (Clessin, 1877)  
 Gyraulus albidus Radoman, 1953
 Gyraulus albus (O. F. Müller, 1774) - White ramshorn
 † Gyraulus alienus (Rolle, 1862) 
 † Gyraulus andrussovi (Ali-Zade & Kabakova in Ali-Zade, 1969) 
 †  Gyraulus applanatus (Thomä, 1845) 
 Gyraulus argaeicus (Sturany, 1904)
 † Gyraulus arminiensis Jekelius, 1932 
 † Gyraulus atkinsoni (Johnston, 1879)
 † Gyraulus bakonicus (Halaváts, 1903) 
 Gyraulus bekaensis Glöer & Bössneck, 2007
 Gyraulus biwaensis (Preston, 1916)
 † Gyraulus bondartchuki (Prysjazhnjuk, 1974)
 Gyraulus borealis (Lovén in Westerlund, 1875) 
 † Gyraulus chaenostomus (Brusina, 1902) 
 Gyraulus chinensis (Dunker, 1848)
 † Gyraulus circumstriatus (Tryon, 1866)
 Gyraulus convexiusculus  
 Gyraulus corinna (Gray, 1850)
 † Gyraulus costatus (Klein, 1846) 
 Gyraulus costulatus (Krauss, 1848)
 Gyraulus crenophilus Hubendick & Radoman, 1959
 † Gyraulus crescens (Hilgendorf, 1867) 
 † Gyraulus cryptornatus (Sauerzopf, 1953) 
 † Gyraulus dealbatus (Braun in Walchner, 1851) 
 Gyraulus deflectus 
 † Gyraulus denudatus (Hilgendorf, 1867) 
 † Gyraulus distortus (Hyatt, 1880)
 † Gyraulus doricus (Bukowski, 1896) 
 Gyraulus edgbastonensis D. S. Brown, 2001
 † Gyraulus edlaueri (Sauerzopf, 1953) 
 Gyraulus egirdirensis Glöer & Girod, 2013
 † Gyraulus ehrenbergi (Beck, 1837)
 Gyraulus elenae Vinarski, Glöer & Palatov, 2013  
 Gyraulus essingtonensis (E. A. Smith, 1882)
 Gyraulus eugyne Meier-Brook, 1983
 Gyraulus euphraticus (Mousson, 1874)
 Gyraulus fontinalis Hubendick & Radoman, 1959
 † Gyraulus fuchsi (Lörenthey, 1902) 
 † Gyraulus geminus (Brusina, 1897) 
 Gyraulus gilberti (Dunker, 1848)
 † Gyraulus globosus (Sauerzopf, 1953)
 † Gyraulus goetzendorfensis (Sauerzopf, 1953) 
 Gyraulus hebraicus (Bourguignat, 1852)
 † Gyraulus helicophantoides (Pavlović, 1927) 
 † Gyraulus homalosomus (Brusina, 1902) 
 Gyraulus homsensis (Dautzenberg, 1894)
 Gyraulus hornensis F. C. Baker, 1934
 Gyraulus huwaizahensis Glôer & Naser, 2005
 Gyraulus ioanis Glöer & Pešić, 2007
 Gyraulus janinensis (Mousson, 1859)
 Gyraulus kahuica (Finlay & Laws, 1931)
 † Gyraulus kleini (Gottschick & Wenz, 1916) 
 Gyraulus kosiensis Glöer & Bössneck, 2013
 † Gyraulus krohi Neubauer & Harzhauser in Harzhauser et al., 2014 
 Gyraulus laevis (Alder, 1838)
 † Gyraulus ludovici (Noulet, 1854) 
 Gyraulus luguhuensis Shu, Köhler, Fu & Wang, 2013
 Gyraulus lychnidicus Hesse, 1928
 † Gyraulus marinkovici (Brusina, 1892) 
 † Gyraulus matraensis Gál et al., 1999 †
 Gyraulus mauritianus (Morelet, 1876)
 Gyraulus meierbrooki Glöer & Pešić, 2007
 † Gyraulus micromphalus (Fuchs, 1870) 
 † Gyraulus minutus (Hilgendorf, 1867) 
 † Gyraulus nedici (Brusina, 1902) 
 Gyraulus nedyalkovi Glöer & Georgiev, 2012
 † Gyraulus oecsensis Wenz, 1919 
 † Gyraulus okrugljakensis Neubauer, Harzhauser, Kroh, Georgopoulou & Mandic, 2014 †
 † Gyraulus oxystoma (Klein, 1846) 
 Gyraulus pamphylicus Glöer & Rähle, 2009
 Gyraulus parvus (Say, 1817)
 Gyraulus piscinarum (Bourguignat, 1852)
 † Gyraulus platystomus Nützel & Bandel, 1993 (?) 
 † Gyraulus popovici (Pavlović, 1927) 
 † Gyraulus primiformis (Sauerzopf, 1953) 
 † Gyraulus protectus Jekelius, 1944 
 † Gyraulus protocrescens Nützel & Bandel, 1993 
 † Gyraulus pseudhomalosomus (Sauerzopf, 1953) 
 † Gyraulus pseudotenuis (Hilgendorf, 1867) 
 † Gyraulus ptycophorus (Brusina, 1892) 
 † Gyraulus pulici (Brusina, 1897) 
 † Gyraulus quadrangulus (Neumayr in Herbich & Neumayr, 1875) 
 † Gyraulus rasseri Neubauer, Harzhauser, Kroh, Georgopoulou & Mandic, 2014†
 † Gyraulus revertens (Hilgendorf, 1867) 
 † Gyraulus rhytidophorus (Brusina, 1902) 
 Gyraulus riparius
 Gyraulus rossmaessleri (Auerswald, 1852)
 Gyraulus stankovici Hadzisce, 1955
 Gyraulus rotula (Benson, 1850)
 † Gyraulus rotundistomus (Sauerzopf, 1953) 
 † Gyraulus rotundostomus Nützel & Bandel, 1993 
 † Gyraulus rumanus Wenz in Krejci-Graf & Wenz, 1932 
 † Gyraulus sabljari (Brusina, 1892) 
 † Gyraulus sachsenhoferi Harzhauser & Neubauer in Harzhauser et al., 2012 
 † Gyraulus seibersdorfensis (Sauerzopf, 1953) 
 Gyraulus shasi Glöer & Pešić, 2007
 Gyraulus sivalensis (Clessin, 1884)
 † Gyraulus soceni Jekelius, 1944 
 † Gyraulus solenoeides (Lörenthey, 1902) 
 Gyraulus spirillus (Gould, 1859)
 Gyraulus stankovici Hadžišče, 1953
 † Gyraulus steinheimensis (Hilgendorf, 1867) 
 † Gyraulus subhemistoma (d'Orbigny, 1852) 
 † Gyraulus sulcatus (Hilgendorf, 1867) 
 † Gyraulus supremus (Hilgendorf, 1867) 
 † Gyraulus symmetricus (Sauerzopf, 1953) 
 Gyraulus taseviensis Glöer & Girod, 2013
 Gyraulus terekholicus (Prozorova & Starobogatov, 1997) 
 Gyraulus terraesacrae Rensch, 1934
 Gyraulus tokyoensis (Mori, 1938)
 Gyraulus transsylvanicus (Neumayr in Herbich & Neumayr, 1875) †
 Gyraulus trapezoides Polinski, 1929
 † Gyraulus triquetrus (Hilgendorf, 1867) 
 † Gyraulus trochiformis (Stahl, 1824) 
 † Gyraulus trolli (Sauerzopf, 1953) 
 † Gyraulus turislavicus Jekelius, 1944 
  Gyraulus vermicularis (Gould, 1847)
 † Gyraulus vermicularis (Stoliczka, 1862) 
 † Gyraulus verticillus (Brusina, 1892) 
 † Gyraulus vrapceanus Neubauer, Harzhauser, Kroh, Georgopoulou & Mandic, 2014 
 Gyraulus waterhousei (Clessin, 1885)
 † Gyraulus zemendorfensis (Sauerzopf, 1953) 

Species inquirenda
 Gyraulus acutus Clessin, 1907
 Gyraulus percarinatus Paraense, 2000 name unavailable under ICZN Art. 16.4)
Species brought into synonymy
 Gyraulus deformis Hartmann, 1844: synonym of Gyraulus acronicus (Férussac, 1807)
 † Gyraulus trochiformis applanatus (Thomä, 1845): synonym of † Gyraulus applanatus (Thomä, 1845) 
  †  Gyraulus (Gyraulus) trochiformis applanatus var. ludovici (Noulet, 1854): synonym of  † Gyraulus ludovici (Noulet, 1854) 
 † Gyraulus (Gyraulus) trochiformis kleini var. aequeumbilicatus (Hilgendorf, 1867): synonym of  † Gyraulus kleini (Gottschick & Wenz, 1916) 
 † Gyraulus (Gyraulus) trochiformis kleini var. subinvolutus Gottschick, 1920: synonym of † Gyraulus kleini (Gottschick & Wenz, 1916)
 † Gyraulus (Gyraulus) trochiformis kleini var. subkleini Gottschick, 1920: synonym of † Gyraulus kleini (Gottschick & Wenz, 1916)
 † Gyraulus (Gyraulus) trochiformis steinheimensis var. parvus (Hilgendorf, 1867): synonym of  † Gyraulus steinheimensis (Hilgendorf, 1867) 
 † Gyraulus (Gyraulus) trochiformis subhemistoma var. teres (Hilgendorf, 1867): synonym of † Gyraulus minutus (Hilgendorf, 1867) 
 † Gyraulus (Gyraulus) trochiformis subhemistoma var. triquetrus (Hilgendorf, 1867): synonym of  † Gyraulus triquetrus (Hilgendorf, 1867) 
 † Gyraulus (Gyraulus) trochiformis trochiformis var. elegans (Hilgendorf, 1867): synonym of † Gyraulus trochiformis (Stahl, 1824) 
 † Gyraulus (Gyraulus) trochiformis trochiformis var. turbiniformis (von Zieten, 1832): synonym of  † Gyraulus trochiformis (Stahl, 1824)

References

External links

 BioLib taxonomy info
Gyraulus images at  Consortium for the Barcode of Life